Matteo Teoldi (born May 12, 1985 in Ponte San Pietro) is an Italian professional footballer who plays as a defender for Eccellenza club A.S.D. CazzagoBornato since 2018.

He represented Italy at the 2004 UEFA European Under-19 Football Championship.

References

External links
 

1985 births
Living people
Italian footballers
Italy youth international footballers
Serie B players
F.C. Lumezzane V.G.Z. A.S.D. players
Venezia F.C. players
A.S. Cittadella players
Association football defenders
People from Ponte San Pietro
Sportspeople from the Province of Bergamo
Footballers from Lombardy